Lauvale Sape (born August 29, 1980) is a former American football defensive tackle. He was drafted by the Buffalo Bills in the sixth round of the 2003 NFL Draft. He played college football at Utah.

Sape has also been a member of the Berlin Thunder, Oakland Raiders, Tennessee Titans, New Orleans VooDoo, and Colorado Crush.

Early years
Sape attended Leilehua High School in Wahiawa, Hawaii and was a student and a football letterman, he graduated in 1998. In football, he was a first-team All-State selection.

Professional career

Buffalo Bills
Sape's only moment with the Buffalo Bills came during a pre-season game when he blocked a punt. He was later cut by the team at final cuts

Berlin Thunder
Sape was drafted by the Berlin Thunder in the second round of the 2007 NFL Europa Free Agent Draft.

Las Vegas Locomotives
Sape was signed by the Las Vegas Locomotives of the United Football League on August 31, 2009.

References

External links
 Utah Utes bio

1980 births
Living people
American sportspeople of Samoan descent
Converts to Mormonism
American football defensive tackles
Utah Utes football players
Buffalo Bills players
Berlin Thunder players
Oakland Raiders players
Tennessee Titans players
New Orleans VooDoo players
Colorado Crush players
Las Vegas Locomotives players
Utah Blaze players
Players of American football from American Samoa
American Samoan Latter Day Saints